Laiano is a village in Campania, southern Italy, administratively a frazione of the comune of Sant'Agata de' Goti, province of Benevento.

Laiano is about 35 km from Benevento and 10 km from Sant'Agata de' Goti.

References 

Frazioni of the Province of Benevento